Boris Becker was the defending champion but did not compete that year.

Goran Ivanišević won in the final 4–6, 6–7(4–7), 7–6(7–4), 6–2, 6–3 against Greg Rusedski.

Seeds

  Yevgeny Kafelnikov (first round)
  Sergi Bruguera (first round)
  Goran Ivanišević (champion)
  Greg Rusedski (final)
  Gustavo Kuerten (second round)
  Thomas Muster (second round)
  Félix Mantilla (first round)
  Thomas Enqvist (second round)

Draw

Final

Section 1

Section 2

External links
 1997 CA-TennisTrophy draw

Singles